Fall is, or was respectively, a small village (Kirchdorf) in the Lenggries municipality in Landkreis Bad Tölz-Wolfratshausen, Upper Bavaria, Germany. It is located on an peninsula of Lake Sylvenstein.

It is named after Faller Klamm, which is located northward. Older names were Am Fall oder Zum Faal. The village is mentioned first in 1280 as a farm house.

In 1954, the old village was abandoned because of the construction of Sylvenstein Dam (Sylvensteinspeicher). The village was flooded intentionally in 1959.
A newly built village with the same name was created at a height of 773 metres and 100 metres away from the former location.

As of March 20, 2015 the village had a population of 111. The village is connected via Bundesstraße 307. A road bridge (built in 1959) named Faller-Klamm-Brücke spans over the lake starting in the northeast and has a length of 329 metres.

Literature 
 Ludwig Ganghofer, Der Jäger von Fall. 1883. (Onlinefassung) 
 Anton Böhm, Fall – Das versunkene Dorf. Selbstverlag, Rottach-Egern 2003. 
 Anton Böhm, Fall – das Dorf und der Speicher (das Schicksal eines Dorfes). Selbstverlag, Rottach-Egern 2008. 
 Stephan Bammer (Hrsg.): Die obere Isar - eine Zeitreise: Alt-Fall, Neu-Fall, Sylvensteinspeicher. Eder-Verlag, Lenggries 1997, . 
 Vasco Boenisch, Martina Farmbauer, Versunkene Erinnerungen. Vor fünfzig Jahren verschwand ein ganzer Ort. In: Süddeutsche Zeitung. 14. November 2003. 
 Neu-Fall, Oberbayern. In: Baumeister. Band 57, 1960, S. 540 f. 
 Ein versunkenes Dorf taucht wieder auf. In: Süddeutsche Zeitung. 5. Dezember 2015.

External links 

 Historische Karte des Gebiets (Urpositionsblätter, Blatt RISS, 1864)

References 

Bad Tölz-Wolfratshausen
Planned communities
1959 floods in Europe 
1959 in Germany